Patterton railway station is a railway station serving the Patterton, Crookfur and Greenlaw areas of the town of Newton Mearns, East Renfrewshire and the Deaconsbank and Jennylind areas of the City of Glasgow, Scotland.

History 
The station was originally opened as part of the Lanarkshire and Ayrshire Railway on 1 May 1903. It closed on 1 January 1917 due to wartime economy, and reopened on 1 February 1919 as Patterton for Darnley Rifle Range (sometimes referred to as simply Patterton for Darnley). It was renamed back to Patterton by British Rail.

Facilities
The station is unstaffed and only has shelters on each platform.  A ticket machine is available to allow passengers to purchase their ticket before boarding the train.  A long-line P.A and digital information displays provide train running information.  The station footbridge is not accessible for disabled users, but there is step-free access to each platform via ramps from the nearby road.

Services 
Patterton is an intermediate station on the Glasgow Central — Neilston line. The line was electrified in 1962. Since then the basic service has been a 30-minute service on Mondays to Saturdays, with additional peak hour services on Mondays to Fridays. In the early part of the 21st century, a 30-minute service was also provided on Sundays.

 "Blue Train" electric multiple units provided almost all trains services for many years thereafter, being joined by the similar .

Fire 
On 24 February 2009, during repair works to a nearby bridge, a road laying vehicle caught fire which then spread to a gas mains pipe on the bridge. Soon after, the area was evacuated and all services through Patterton were suspended until the blaze was brought under control. During the suspension of services, passengers alighted at Cathcart railway station to a replacement bus service.

References

Notes

Sources

External links
Video footage of Patterton Station

Railway stations in East Renfrewshire
Former Caledonian Railway stations
Railway stations in Great Britain opened in 1903
Railway stations in Great Britain closed in 1917
Railway stations in Great Britain opened in 1919
Railway stations served by ScotRail
Newton Mearns